Jonkheer François Daniël Changuion (Demerara, 16 February 1766 - Offenbach am Main, 15 June 1850), commonly known as Daniël Changuion, was a Dutch administrator and diplomat. Some of his descendants settled in South Africa in the nineteenth century.

Family 
The Changuion family is of French origin. Daniel Changuion's grandfather, François Changuion, settled in Amsterdam in 1717/1718. His father was François (1727-1777), a councilor of the court of justice in the Dutch colony of Essequibo, and his mother was Anna Geertruida (van) Gelskerke (1730-1795).

In 1800 in Emmerik Daniël Changuion married Henriëtte Wilhelmina Hartingh (1775-1860), daughter of a prominent Leidener, Nicolaas Hartingh (son of the Dutch East India Company Governor Nicolaas Hartingh), and Louise Ernestine Meyners. Four children were born from their marriage: François Daniël (1801-1854), Louise Anne (1802-1872), Antoine Nicolas Ernest (1803-1881) and Laurent Jonathan (1805-1851).

Course of life 

Changuion graduated in law at Leiden University in 1788. From 1788 he was councilor and alderman of Leiden. In 1795, when the Batavian Republic was proclaimed in the Netherlands, he was dismissed from his administrative posts and went abroad. In 1803 he returned to the Netherlands where he settled in The Hague. There he became involved in the Triumvirate of 1813. He joined them and their ideas about the organization of the country and from 17 to 29 November 1813 he acted as secretary of the Triumvirate or the provisional government. This Triumvirate under Van Hogendorp recalled Prince William of Orange from exile in Britain in November 1813 to become sovereign prince of the Netherlands. Thanks to his role as secretary, F.D. Changuion counts as one of the founders of the Kingdom of the Netherlands. His name is then also mentioned with the members of the Triumvirate on the monument on the 1813 Square in The Hague. In January 1814 Changuion was appointed by the sovereign prince as the Netherlands' first envoy to the United States of America and in May he left for there with his family. However, given the war conditions the US found itself in, there was little he could do there. Due to these circumstances, he only received the letter in May 1815 in which it appeared that he had been appointed ambassador in Constantinople in December 1814. He returned to the Netherlands but was nevertheless not sent to Constantinople and was given a pension in 1818.

In 1815, François Daniël Changuion was elevated to the Dutch nobility by King Willem I due to his role as secretary of the provisional government of the Netherlands (the Triumvirate under Van Hogendorp) in 1813. Accordingly, he and his descendants were given the right to use the predicate Jonkheer or Jonkvrouw.

From Changuion's letters of around 1818, it is clear that, for various reasons, his finances were in serious trouble. Out of desperation he then proceeded to forge and collect bills at the expense of old acquaintances, to the amount of 44000 guilders. After collecting the money in the Netherlands, he defected to Germany. Requests for Changuion to be extradited to the Netherlands were unsuccessful. He was subsequently sentenced in absentia by a court on 27 February 1823 to ten years' imprisonment and a fine of 11,000 guilders. Because of this dishonorable sentence, he was not included in the first list of persons belonging to the nobility in 1825. His children, who were all born before 27 February 1823 (the date of his sentence), were mentioned on this list, remained of nobility and also passed their nobility on to their descendants. This is also the position of the High Council of Nobility in the Netherlands.

Changuion died in 1850 in Germany at the age of 84, while his wife died in 1860.

Of Changuion's four children, one produced progeny. His son Antoine Nicolas Ernest Changuion (1803-1881), who settled in Cape Town in 1831, became the progenitor of a numerous offspring in South Africa who belong to the Dutch nobility.

References 

1766 births
1850 deaths
Leiden University alumni
Dutch diplomats
Dutch nobility